Václav Becvár (17 September 1908 – 1978) was a Czechoslovak male weightlifter, who competed in the heavyweight class and represented Czechoslovakia at international competitions. He won the bronze medal at the 1947 World Weightlifting Championships in the +82.5 kg category. He also competed at the 1936 Summer Olympics.

References

1908 births
1978 deaths
Czechoslovak male weightlifters
Czech male weightlifters
World Weightlifting Championships medalists
Sportspeople from České Budějovice
Olympic weightlifters of Czechoslovakia
Weightlifters at the 1936 Summer Olympics